AFSB may refer to:

 Afloat Forward Staging Base, U.S. Navy
 Air Force Studies Board, National Academy of Sciences
 Air Force Selection Board, Indian Air Force